David Holmes may refer to:

Academics
 David L. Holmes (born 1932), American academic
 Dave Holmes (researcher) (born 1967), Canadian researcher and academic

Arts and entertainment
 David Holmes (musician) (born 1969), Northern Irish electronic musician and composer
 David Holmes, drummer and vocalist for Servant
 Dave Holmes (actor) (born 1971), American MTV VJ, television presenter and actor
 David Holmes (actor) (born 1981), British stuntman and actor in the Harry Potter films

Politics and government
 David Holmes (politician) (1769–1832), last governor of the Mississippi Territory and the first governor of the State of Mississippi, congressman from Virginia
 David Holmes (trade unionist) (1843–1906), British trade unionist
 Ronald Holmes (David Ronald Holmes, 1913–1981), British colonial government official
 David Holmes (journalist) (1926–2014), BBC political editor
 David S. Holmes Jr. (1914–1994), American politician in Michigan,
 David Holmes (diplomat), United States Department of State official

Sports
 David Holmes (businessman), former Chairman of Rangers F.C.
 Dave Holmes (American football) (1924–1999), American football player and coach
 Dave Holmes (sportscaster), American sportscaster